Sekonj (also known as Sagūch, Segach, Seh Gūsh, Seh Konj, and Sheykh ‘Alī Bābā) is a village in Mahan Rural District, Mahan District, Kerman County, Kerman Province, Iran. At the 2006 census, its population was 443, in 116 families.

References 

Populated places in Kerman County